Conchita Martínez and Patricia Tarabini were the defending champions, but none competed this year.

Julie Halard-Decugis and Ai Sugiyama won the title by defeating Nana Miyagi and Paola Suárez 6–0, 6–2 in the final.

Seeds

Draw

Draw

References

External links
 Official results archive (ITF)
 Official results archive (WTA)

Doubles
Toyota Princess Cup - Doubles